Hereditary Prince of Portugal (Portuguese: Príncipe Herdeiro de Portugal), unofficially Prince of Portugal (Príncipe Herdeiro de Portugal), or Princess of Portugal, was the title held by the heirs apparent and heirs presumptive to the Kingdom of Portugal, from 1433 to 1645. 

The title differs from the title Infante of Portugal, which is the title given to all children of the monarch except the first in the line of succession, and is often translated into English as "prince".

History 
Due to English tradition introduced to the Portuguese court by Philippa of Lancaster, her son King Edward sought to create a princely title for the heir apparent, much like the Prince of Wales, to distinguish him from his siblings, who were infantes. Until that time, the heir apparent was also titled infante.

In 1433 Edward granted the title of Prince of Portugal to his eldest son, the future King Afonso V. The monarchies of Castile, Aragon and England already had princely titles for their heirs apparent and now Portugal had one, so that foreign powers would not underestimate the prestige of the kingdom.

In 1645, the title was replaced with Prince of Brazil.

List of holders

See also
Manuel, Prince Hereditary of Portugal, illegitimate son of António, Prior of Crato